is a Japanese politician and the current governor of Ehime Prefecture, located in the Shikoku region of Japan. He succeeded Moriyuki Kato in the 2010 Ehime gubernatorial election. Nakamura has previously served as the mayor of Matsuyama, the largest city in Ehime and Shikoku, from 1999 to 2010. He has also represented Ehime in the national House of Representatives from 1993 to 1996 and before that in the Ehime Prefectural Assembly from 1987 to 1990.

After graduating from Keio University with a degree in law in 1982, he briefly entered Mitsubishi Corporation before commencing his political career, following in the footsteps of his father Tokio Nakamura, who also served in the House of Representatives from 1953 until 1960 and from 1963 until 1969 and then as mayor of Matsuyama from 1975 until 1991.

Championships and accomplishments
DDT Pro-Wrestling
Ironman Heavymetalweight Championship (1 time)

References 

1960 births
Living people
Keio University alumni
Governors of Ehime Prefecture
Politicians from Ehime Prefecture